Lois Ragnhild Capps (née Grimsrud; January 10, 1938) is an American politician who served as the U.S. representative for  from 1998 to 2017. She is a member of the Democratic Party. The district, numbered as the 22nd District from 1998 to 2003 and the 23rd from 2003 to 2013, includes all of Santa Barbara and San Luis Obispo counties and a portion of Ventura County.

Capps served on the U.S. House Committee on Energy and Commerce, where she was a member of the Energy and Air Quality Subcommittee and the Subcommittee on Health. She was a member of the New Democrat Coalition.

Early life and education
Capps was born Lois Ragnhild Grimsrud in Ladysmith, Wisconsin, the daughter of Solveig Magdalene (née Gullixson) and Rev. Jurgen Milton Grimsrud, a Lutheran minister. Both of her parents' families came from Norway. She has lived in Santa Barbara since 1964. She was educated at Pacific Lutheran University with a bachelor's degree in nursing. She earned a master's degree in religion at Yale Divinity School in 1964 and a Master of Arts degree in education at the University of California, Santa Barbara in 1990.

U.S. House of Representatives

Elections
Walter Capps was elected to Congress in 1996 in a rematch of his 1994 race against Republican Andrea Seastrand. However, he died of a heart attack on October 28, 1997, only nine months into his term. His widow won the then-22nd District seat by defeating Republican Tom Bordonaro in a special election on March 10, 1998. She was sworn into the 105th Congress on March 17. Lois Capps successfully defended her seat against Bordonaro in a general election later that year, and commenced her first full term in office.

In 2000, Capps retained the 22nd district seat, defeating Republican Mike Stoker with 53% of the vote. She was the first Democrat to hold the district for more than one term in over 50 years (the district, known as the 11th from its formation in 1943 until 1953, the 13th from 1953 to 1975 and the 19th from 1975 to 1993, had been held by Republicans from 1947 until Walter Capps was sworn in 1997).

Capps' district was renumbered as the 23rd after the 2000 census and made somewhat safer, and she was reelected without serious opposition in 2002, 2004, 2006, 2008 and 2010. Her district was renumbered as the 24th District after the 2010 census. David Wasserman, House editor of The Cook Political Report, predicted that this would be a more difficult race, and local Republicans confirmed that Capps was one of their top targets in California. The reconfigured district still includes Santa Barbara and San Luis Obispo, but was redrawn to include most of the more Republican inland areas of Santa Barbara County. Capps eventually beat her opponent, Abel Maldonado, with 54.8% of the vote.

In 2014, Capps ran against Republican Chris Mitchum, an actor, screenwriter, and businessman. Mitchum is the son of legendary film star Robert Mitchum. This was Mitchum's second consecutive try for the 24th district, having previously lost the 2012 primary to Abel Maldonado. In the closest race of her entire congressional career, Capps ultimately won with only a 3.8% margin over Mitchum.

Capps announced in April 2015 that she would not seek reelection in 2016.

Political positions
Capps has been described as a "solid liberal". In The Washingtonian magazine's 2006 "Best and Worst of Congress" poll of congressional staffers, Capps was named the nicest member of Congress.

In 2011, Capps voted for the National Defense Authorization Act for Fiscal Year 2012 as part of a controversial provision that allows the government and the military to indefinitely detain American citizens and others without trial.

Health care
Capps supported the Obama administration's economic stimulus and the Patient Protection and Affordable Care Act. She was strongly critical of the Stupak–Pitts Amendment to the latter, which placed limits on taxpayer-funding of abortions (except in the cases of rape, incest, or threat to the mother's life). Capps had earlier sponsored the Capps Amendment, which was defeated and replaced by the Stupak Amendment. Capps introduced the National Pediatric Research Network Act of 2013 which would, if enacted, authorize the NIH to support, fund, and coordinate data from research on rare pediatric diseases.

Foreign policy
In 2012, she was the only member of the House to vote "no" on Resolution 556 to condemn the government of Iran for its continued persecution, imprisonment, and sentencing of Youcef Nadarkhani of the charge of apostasy. The resolution passed 417–1 with 15 non-votes. Her spokeswoman later said that Capps strongly supported the resolution, but cast the no vote by mistake.

Environmental policy
In 2004, the House passed her piece of legislation to prohibit "comprehensive inventory of oil and gas resources beneath the outer continental shelf." She was also a vocal opponent of drilling for oil in the Los Padres National Forest and offshore drilling off the coast of California.

Legislation sponsored
 To provide for the conveyance of a small parcel of National Forest System land in Los Padres National Forest in California (H.R. 3008; 113th Congress) - Capps introduced this bill, which would swap a parcel of federal land with the White Lotus Foundation in exchange for a parcel of their land. The White Lotus Foundation offers training in yoga and wants the land to build better access to their site.

Committee assignments
Committee on Energy and Commerce
Subcommittee on Energy and Power
Subcommittee on Environment and Economy
Subcommittee on Health

Caucus membership
Co-Chair of the Congressional Caucus on Women's Issues
Co-Chair of the National Marine Sanctuary Caucus
Co-Chair of the Congressional Coastal Caucus
Co-Chair of the Biomedical Research Caucus
Co-Chair of the House Cancer Caucus
Co-Chair of the Congressional Heart and Stroke Coalition
Co-Founder and Co-Chair of the Congressional Caucus on Infant Health and Safety
Founded the Congressional Nursing Caucus
Founded the School Health and Safety Caucus
Member of the Veterinary Medicine Caucus

Personal life 
In 1960, while at Yale, she married Walter Capps, a divinity student at Yale who later became a prominent religious studies professor at UCSB; they eventually had three children. Walter died in 1997 and their eldest daughter Lisa died in 2000. Lois Capps worked for 20 years as a nurse and health advocate for the Santa Barbara public schools and also taught early childhood education part-time at Santa Barbara City College. Capps' daughter, Laura, was married to Bill Burton, a political consultant who served as Deputy White House Press Secretary in the Obama administration.

See also
 Women in the United States House of Representatives

References

External links

 

|-

|-

|-

|-

1938 births
21st-century American politicians
21st-century American women politicians
American Lutherans
American nurses
American women nurses
American people of Norwegian descent
Female members of the United States House of Representatives
Living people
Democratic Party members of the United States House of Representatives from California
Pacific Lutheran University alumni
People from Ladysmith, Wisconsin
Spouses of California politicians
University of California, Santa Barbara alumni
Women in California politics
Yale Divinity School alumni